The 2019 ADAC 24 Hours of Nürburgring was the 47th running of the 24 Hours of Nürburgring. It took place over 20–23 June 2019.

The Phoenix Racing team won the race in an Audi R8 LMS Evo.

Race results 
Class winners in bold.

Notes

References

External links 
Entry list
Provisional results

Nürburgring 24 Hours
2019 in German motorsport
June 2019 sports events in Germany